The whiskered bat (Myotis mystacinus) is a small European bat with long fur.  Although uncommon, M. mystacinus  is often found around human habitation and around water; it is similar to Brandt's bat (Myotis brandtii), from which it was distinguished as a separate species only in 1970.

Overview
The analysis of morphological, behavioural, and especially genetic characters have since identified further cryptic species of whiskered bats in the genus Myotis, including Myotis alcathoe (described in 2001 from Europe). Myotis aurascens and Myotis ikonnikovi are other similar species. Myotis hajastanicus was also included in M. mystacinus until recently, but it was differentiated on the base of morphologic comparison.

Echolocation 
The frequencies used by M. mystacinus for echolocation are 34–102 kHz, have most energy at 53 kHz, and have an average duration of 3.0 ms.

References

External links 
 ARKive Stills, Video

Mouse-eared bats
Bats of Europe
Mammals of Asia
Mammals of Russia
Mammals of Azerbaijan
Mammals of Turkey
Mammals described in 1817
Taxa named by Heinrich Kuhl
Bats of Asia
Bats of Africa